Starfield is an unincorporated community in  Lafayette Township in western Clinton County, in the U.S. state of Missouri. The community is on Missouri Route K and Castile Creek.  The city of Gower is 4.5 miles to the southwest and Plattsburg is 6.5 miles to the southeast. Northwest Starfield Road bears its namesake.

History
The Starfield post office closed in 1914. The origin of the name Starfield is uncertain.

References

Unincorporated communities in Clinton County, Missouri
Unincorporated communities in Missouri